Mount Holdgate is a prominent mountain,  high, with steep icefalls and rock buttresses which provides a clear landmark at the southeast end of Cook Island in the South Sandwich Islands.

References

Mountains and hills of South Georgia and the South Sandwich Islands